Gerald Birney Smith (May 3, 1868 – April 2, 1929)  was a Christian author, educator, and administrator at the Chicago School.

He was born in Middlefield, Massachusetts and attended Brown university in 1891.  He taught at Oberlin Academy, Worcester Academy, and was an active educator his entire life.  While at the University of Chicago, when Shailer Mathews was absent Smith would take up duties of Dean of the department.

He wrote about topics such as Nature worship and also edited the American Journal of Theology and the Journal of Religion.

Works
 Christianity and Critical Theology
 A Dictionary of Religion and Ethics
 The Function of a Critical Theology
 The Nature of Science and of Religion and their Interrelation
 The Problem of Theological Method
 Social Idealism and the Changing Theology
 The Realities of the Christian Religion
 The Christ of Faith and the Jesus of History
 What Shall the Systematic Theologian Expect from the New Testament Scholar?
 Christianity and the Spirit of Democracy
 Democracy and Religious Experience
 Christianity and Political Democracy
 Making Christianity Safe for Democracy
 The Task of the Church in a Democratic Age
 Religious Significance of Jesus's Humanity
 The Christ of Faith and the Jesus of History

References

External links
 
 Gerald Birney Smith
 Smith, Gerald Birney

1868 births
1929 deaths
American theologians
American biblical scholars
American historians of religion
University of Chicago Divinity School faculty